Portrait of the Trip Sisters, also known as Portrait of Margarita Trip as Minerva Teaching Her Sister Anna Maria Trip, is an oil on canvas painting by Dutch artist Ferdinand Bol, created in 1663. It is in the collection of the Rijksmuseum, in Amsterdam, but is currently displayed at the Koninklijke Nederlandse Akademie van Wetenschappen, also in Amsterdam. It is signed and dated 'fBol 1663'.

It shows Margarita Trip (1640-1714) and her sister Anna Maria Trip (1652-1681), both daughters of the merchant Louis Trip and his wife Emerentia Hoefslager. Trip also commissioned the imposing Trippenhuis, over two of whose fireplaces this painting and Portrait of Johanna de Geer and her Children as Charity originally hung.

It originally hung in the corner room on the first floor of the Trippenhuis's southern wing - Hendrik Trip occupied the north wing The Rijksmuseum was housed in the Trippenhuis from 1816 to 1885 and the main hall was divided into two in 1858 to place Rembrandt's The Night Watch and Bartholomeus van der Helst's Meal of the Schutters opposite each other, which may have been the occasion when both the chimney-piece works were added to the Rijksmuseum collection.

External links
 Webpagina Rijksmuseum Amsterdam (as Margarita Trip die als Minerva haar zuster Anna Maria Trip onderwijst).
 RKDimages, kunstwerknummer 1807 (as Allegorie op het onderwijs: dubbelportet van Margarita Trip (1640-1714) en Anna Maria Trip (16-1682)).

Bibliography (in Dutch)
Anoniem (1903) Catalogus der Schilderijen miniaturen, pastels, omlijste teekeningen, enz. in het Rijks-Museum te Amsterdam, Amsterdam: Boek- en kunstdrukkerij v/h Roeloffzen-Hübner en Van Santen, p. 54, cat.nr. 546 (als Het Onderwijs). Zie archive.org.
Anoniem (1934) Catalogus der schilderijen pastels–miniaturen–aquarellen tentoongesteld in het Rijksmuseum te Amsterdam, Amsterdam: J.H. de Bussy, p. 53, cat.nr. 546 (als Het Onderwijs). Zie delpher.nl.
Dyserinck, Johs. (1891) ‘De schuttersmaaltijd van Bartholomeus van der Helst’, De Gids, jrg. 55, p. 381-430. Zie dbnl.org.

Exhibition History
Kinderen op hun mooist. Het kinderportret in de Nederlanden 1500-1700, Frans Halsmuseum, Haarlem, 7 October-31 December 2000, .
Holländsk guldålder. Rembrandt, Frans Hals och deras samtida, Nationalmuseum, Stockholm, 22 September 2005 – 8 January 2006, .
Rembrandt? The Master and his Workshop, Statens Museum for Kunst, Kopenhagen, 4 February-14 May 2006, .

References

Children in art
Trip sisters
1663 paintings
Paintings in the collection of the Rijksmuseum